Shakespeare After All is a book length work of Shakespearean schlolarship, consisting of thirty-eight essays that encompass all thirty-eight of Shakespeare's plays. The book is written by Marjorie Garber and was published in 2004 by Pantheon Books. This learned book is based on 20 years of Garber's lecture courses for undergraduates at Harvard, Haverford  and Yale.

Reception
This book has been positively received.

Newsweek's David Gates says: "Until somebody even smarter than Garber comes along with a 1,200 [page book], this is the indispensable introduction to the indispensable writer, [Shakespeare].

The New Yorker says: "[Garber's] introduction is an exemplary account of what is known about Shakespeare and how his work has been read and regarded through the centuries, while the individual essays display scrupulous subtle close reading."

See also
 Shakespeare's plays
 Shakespeare's Ghost Writers

References

External links 

Shakespeare After All. Marjorie Garber.com
Table of Contents. Powell Books.

2004 non-fiction books
American non-fiction books
Shakespearean scholarship
Literary criticism
Theatre studies
Shakespearean characters by work
Shakespearean comedies
Shakespearean histories
Shakespearean tragedies
English Renaissance plays
Pantheon Books books
English-language books